Day House may refer to:

Judge William T. Day House, Casa Grande, AZ, listed on the NRHP in Arizona
Day House (Prescott, Arizona), listed on the NRHP in Yavapai County, Arizona
Calvin Day House, Hartford, CT, listed on the NRHP in Connecticut
Day House (Hartford, Connecticut), listed on the NRHP in Connecticut
Day-Taylor House, Hartford, CT, listed on the NRHP in Connecticut
Amasa Day House, Moodus, CT, listed on the NRHP in Connecticut
Ivan W. Day House, Stanley, ID, listed on the NRHP in Idaho
Holman Day House, Auburn, ME, listed on the NRHP in Maine
Anna Day House, Cambridge, MA, listed on the NRHP in Massachusetts
Fred Holland Day House, Norwood, MA, listed on the NRHP in Massachusetts
Josiah Day House, West Springfield, MA, listed on the NRHP in Massachusetts
C. C. Day House, Aberdeen, MS, listed on the NRHP in Mississippi
Day House (Springfield, Missouri), listed on the NRHP in Missouri
John W. Day House, Dryden, MI, listed on the NRHP in Michigan
Erastus Day House, Lakewood, OH, listed on the NRHP in Ohio
Edwin and Hattie Day House, Ballinger, TX, listed on the NRHP in Texas
Day-Vandevander Mill, Harmon, WV, listed on the NRHP in West Virginia
Isham Day House, Mequon, WI, listed on the NRHP in Wisconsin
Dr. Fisk Holbrook Day House, Wauwatosa, WI, listed on the NRHP in Wisconsin